José Manuel Puig Casauranc (31 January 1888 – 5 May 1939) was a Mexican politician, diplomat and journalist who served as Secretary of Public Education, Secretary of Industry, Commerce and Labor, Secretary of Foreign Affairs and federal legislator in both the Senate and Chamber of Deputies. As a key adviser to President Plutarco Elías Calles (1924–28), he is credited with drafting Calles's speech to Congress following the assassination of President-elect Alvaro Obregón declaring the end of the age of caudillos and the start of rule of institutions and laws.

Life and career

He did his basic studies in the state of Veracruz and in 1911 he graduated as a medical doctor from the School of Medicine in Mexico City. He was also elected that year as a deputy to the congress, where he was a supporter of Francisco I. Madero. Following the coup of Victoriano Huerta ousting Madero in February 1913, Puig Casauranc refused to recognize Huerta's government, for which he was arrested. He remained exiled in the United States during part of the Mexican Revolution, until he returned to occupy a deputation in 1922.  By then he is clearly identified with the political group of Sonoran generals turned politicians, Álvaro Obregón and Plutarco Elías Calles.

He directed Calles's presidential campaign for the 1924 elections.  Puig Casauranc was elected Senator for Campeche, but Calles appointed him as the head of the Ministry of Public Education. During the interim presidency of Emilio Portes Gil (1928-1930), he served as Head of the Department of the Federal District (1929–30), the jurisdiction of the national capital. Following the election of Pascual Ortiz Rubio as president, he appointed Puig Casauranc as Secretary of Education (1930–31) for a second term, and then Mexican Ambassador to the United States (1931–33). After Ortiz Rubio's resignation, President Abelardo L. Rodríguez appointed him Secretary of Foreign Affairs (1933–34).He was outspoken in this position. The "apogee of his public career was his confrontation with U.S. Secretary of State, Cordell Hull, at the 1933 Pan-American Conference in Montevideo, Uruguay... critici[zing] international bankers and U.S. dominance in the Mexican economy."

In 1934 he refused to direct the presidential campaign of Lázaro Cárdenas. He also turned down offers that Cárdenas himself made him to head a number of ministries.  Instead he was appointed Mexican Ambassador to Argentina (1935–36).

On his return to the country he retired from politics and devoted himself to practicing medicine and to contributing to newspapers such as El Imparcial and El Universal. He was a corresponding member of the Mexican Academy of the Language.

Works
 De la vida (Cuentos crueles) (1922)
 Páginas viejas con ideas actuales (1925)
 De otros días (1926)
 De nuestro México, cosas actuales y aspectos políticos (1926)
 La hermana impura (1927)
 Juárez, una interpretación humana (1928)
 La cosecha y la siembra (1928)
 La cuestión religiosa en relación con la educación primaria en México (1928)
 Su venganza (1930)
 Mirando la vida (1933)
 Una política social económica de preparación socialista (1933)
 El sentido social del proceso histórico de México (1935)
 Los errores de Satanás (1937)
 Galatea rebelde a varios Pigmaliones (1938)

Notes and references
Portions of this article are translated from Spanish Wikipedia.

Further reading

Britton, John A. "José Manuel Puig Casauranc" in Encyclopedia of Latin American History and Culture, vol. 4, p. 500. New York: Charles Scribner's Sons 1996.
Dulles, John F. W. Yesterday in Mexico. Austin: University of Texas Press 1961.

1888 births
1939 deaths
Mexican Secretaries of Education
Mexican Secretaries of Foreign Affairs
Ambassadors of Mexico to the United States
Members of the Chamber of Deputies (Mexico)
Politicians from Ciudad del Carmen
Mexican journalists
Mexican people of Catalan descent
Male journalists
People of the Mexican Revolution
Mexican revolutionaries
20th-century journalists